Deaf Dumb Blind is the debut studio album by Swedish rap metal band Clawfinger. It was released on 21 April 1993.

Background 
The musical content is mainly metal/hard rock modernized with a few electronic elements. The vocal approach is an aggressive flux of words sung in a rap style. The album has ten standard tracks; three bonus tracks were added to the re-release in 2004. Clawfinger also released four singles (detailed below) and three videos ("Nigger", "The Truth" and "Warfair").

The lyrics of "Catch Me" are translated from the Asta Kask song "Dom Får Aldrig Mig".

Track listing 
All tracks by Clawfinger.

 "Nigger" – 3:47
 "The Truth" – 4:12
 "Rosegrove" – 4:02
 "Don't Get Me Wrong" – 3:12
 "I Need You" – 4:58
 "Catch Me" – 4:39
 "Warfair" – 3:48
 "Wonderful World" – 2:40
 "Sad to See Your Sorrow" – 5:18
 "I Don't Care" – 3:11
 "Get It" – 4:44 (bonus track)
 "Profit Preacher" – 5:55 (bonus track)
 "Stars & Stripes" – 3:52 (bonus track)

Personnel 
 Martin Beskow – photography
 Clawfinger – producer
 Björn Engelman – mastering
 Stefan Glaumann – mixing
 Lena Granefelt – photography
 Jacob Hellner – producer
 Adam Kviman – engineer
 Per Kviman – A&R
 Sebastian Oberg – cello, soloist, cover design
 Erlend Ottem – guitar, group member
 Andre Skaug – bass guitar
 Morten Skaug – drums
 Jocke Skog – keyboards, programming, backing vocals, group member
 Zak Tell – vocals, group member
 Bård Torstensen – guitar, backing vocals
Patrik Elofsson – scratches
Gustave Lund – scratches

Released singles 
 "Nigger"
 "The Truth"
 "Rosegrove"
 "Warfair"

Charts

Weekly charts

Year-end charts

Certifications

References

External links 
 
 

Clawfinger albums
1993 debut albums